Russell Mullins (born 3 August 1952) nicknamed "Flight" is an Australian former rugby league footballer who played in the 1970s. He played for Western Suburbs and Penrith in the New South Wales Rugby League (NSWRL) competition.

Background
Mullins is the brother of Bill Mullins and uncle of Brett Mullins.

Playing career
Mullins made his first grade debut for Western Suburbs in 1971.  The club would go on to finish last that season and claim the wooden spoon.  In 1973, Mullins finished as the club's top try scorer with 8 tries.  In 1974, Mullins again finished as the club's top try scorer with 15 tries as Wests made the finals and eventually the preliminary final against Eastern Suburbs.  Mullins played on the wing against his brother Bill as Easts won the match 25-2 at the Sydney Cricket Ground.

In 1975 and 1976, Mullins finished as Wests top try scorer but the club missed out on the finals.  Mullins final season for Wests was in 1977 and he only managed 11 appearances and scored 3 tries before departing to Penrith.  Mullins finished as Western Suburbs sixth highest try scorer.  Mullins spent 2 uneventful years at Penrith where the club struggled towards the bottom of the ladder before retiring at the end of 1979.

References

1952 births
Living people
Australian rugby league players
Western Suburbs Magpies players
Penrith Panthers players
Rugby league players from Sydney
Rugby league wingers